The Cystobasidiomycetes are class of fungi in the subdivision Pucciniomycotina of the Basidiomycota. The class contains six orders: Buckleyzymales, Cyphobasidiales, Cystobasidiales, Erythrobasidiales, Naohideales, and Sakaguchiales.

References

External links 
 

Basidiomycota classes
Pucciniomycotina